Pals is a town in Catalonia, Spain.

PALS may also refer to:

 Pakistan Life Saving Foundation
 Patient Advice and Liaison Service
 Pediatric advanced life support
 Periarteriolar lymphoid sheaths
 Portraits of American Life Study
 Positron annihilation lifetime spectroscopy
 Pouch Attachment Ladder System
 Prague Asterix Laser System
 Public Access Legal Support

See also 
 Pal's, regional U.S. restaurant
 PAL (disambiguation)